Enaretta conifera is a species of beetle in the family Cerambycidae. It was described by Per Olof Christopher Aurivillius in 1921.

References

Enaretta
Beetles described in 1921